Boris Markovich Berlatsky (1889—1937) was a senior official of the State Bank of the USSR. He was 41 when he was a defendant in 1931 Menshevik Trial, one of the first show trials in the Soviet Union.

Berlatsky's "confession" included an account of how he met with Fyodor Dan, Rudolph Hilferding, Van der Velde, Karl Kautsky and Leon Blum while in Berlin in 1925. He was sentenced to four years in prison.

References

1889 births
1937 deaths
1931 Menshevik Trial
Victims of Red Terror in Soviet Russia